Al-Shafa (Arabic: الصفا Aṣ-Ṣafā) may refer to:

 Al-Safa and Al-Marwah, two small hills in Saudi Arabia
 Al-Safa (Syria), a hilly region in southern Syria
 Al-Safa' SC, a Lebanese sports club based in Beirut

See also
 Safa (disambiguation)